Louis Adam Lipps (born August 9, 1962) is an American former professional football player who was a wide receiver for nine seasons in the National Football League (NFL), spending eight seasons with the Pittsburgh Steelers and one with the New Orleans Saints.

He was drafted by the Pittsburgh Steelers in the 1st round of the 1984 NFL Draft after a college football career at the University of Southern Mississippi. Lipps also attended East St. John High School in Reserve, Louisiana.

College Statistics
1980: 2 catches for 28 yards. 8 punt returns for 54 yards. 3 kick returns for 61 yards.
1981: 9 catches for 181 yards and 1 touchdown. 7 punt returns for 31 yards.
1982: 38 catches for 468 yards and 2 touchdowns. 2 carries for 10 yards. 23 punt returns for 280 yards and 1 touchdown.
1983: 42 catches for 800 yards and 5 touchdowns. 6 carries for 52 yards and 1 touchdown. 40 punt returns for 460 yards.

NFL career
His teammate John Stallworth took him under his wing when he was a rookie. In his first season, Lipps broke the National Football League record for punt return yardage by a rookie with 656 yards. Louis returned one punt for a touchdown and also caught 45 passes for 860 receiving yards and 9 receiving touchdowns. He was named the NFL's Offensive Rookie of the Year at season's end and was also named to the AFC Pro Bowl team for that year.

Lipps' second season in 1985 saw him go over 1,000 receiving yards with 1,134 and 12 touchdown receptions. He was named 1st Team All-Pro by the Newspaper Enterprise Association (NEA) and the Pro Football Writers Association (PFWA) and 2nd Team All-Pro by the Associated Press (AP). He also earned a second straight trip to the Pro Bowl. The Steelers named him the Team's MVP for the 1985 season. Lipps struggled with injuries during the 1986 and 1987 seasons but rebounded in 1988, finishing with 50 catches for 973 receiving yards and 5 touchdown catches including the Steel City Wonder, where he caught a ball in his facemask and scored. One of his injuries occurred in 1986 against the defending Super Bowl champion Chicago Bears, where he viciously took an elbow to the face by Bears linebacker Otis Wilson. In 1989, Lipps again led the team in receptions (50), receiving yards (944) and receiving touchdowns (5) and was named Team MVP for the second time.

Lipps left the Steelers for one season  to play for the New Orleans Saints for two games in 1992 before retiring as a Steeler in 1993. Lipps caught 359 passes for 6031 yards and 39 touchdowns in his career.

References

External links
 Official site of the Pittsburgh Steelers

Players of American football from New Orleans
American football wide receivers
Southern Miss Golden Eagles football players
Pittsburgh Steelers players
New Orleans Saints players
American Conference Pro Bowl players
National Football League Offensive Rookie of the Year Award winners
1962 births
Living people